The Innis-Gérin Medal is an award of the Royal Society of Canada for a distinguished and sustained contribution to the literature of the social sciences. It was established in 1966 and is given biennially. The award is named in honor of Harold Innis and Léon Gérin.

Winners
Source: Royal Society of Canada
 2020 - Nancy Turner, FRSC
 2018 - Jennifer Clapp
 2016 - John A. Hall, FRSC
 2014 - Janine Brodie, FRSC
 2014 - John McGarry, FRSC
 2011 - Georges Dionne, FRSC
 2007 - Gilbert Laporte
 2003 - Richard E. Tremblay, MSRC
 2001 - Byron P. Rourke, FRSC
 1999 - Rodolphe De Koninck, MSRC
 1997 - Norman S. Endler
 1995 - Albert Legault, MSRC
 1991 - Thérèse Gouin-Décarie, MSRC
 1989 - Albert Faucher, MSRC
 1987 - Anthony D. Scott, FRSC
 1985 - Bruce G. Trigger, FRSC
 1983 - Malcolm C. Urquhart, FRSC
 1981 - H. Gordon Skilling, FRSC
 1979 - Marc-Adélard Tremblay, MSRC
 1977 - Harry G. Johnson
 1975 - Noël Mailloux
 1973 - Jean-Charles Falardeau
 1971 - Jacques Henripin
 1969 - Alexander Brady, FRSC
 1968 - Esdras Minville
 1967 - W.A. Mackintosh, FRSC

See also

 List of social sciences awards

References

Canadian non-fiction literary awards
1967 establishments in Canada
Awards established in 1967
Royal Society of Canada
Science writing awards
Social sciences awards
Harold Innis